Australian Idol is an Australian singing competition, which began its first season in July 2003 and ended its initial run in November 2009. As part of the Idol franchise, Australian Idol originated from the reality program Pop Idol, which was created by British entertainment executive Simon Fuller. Australian Idol was televised on Network Ten for its first seven series and was broadcast on the Southern Cross Austereo Radio Network between 2005 and 2007. The series returned in 2023 after Seven Network announced they would be picking up the show.

Finalists
{| class=infobox style=width:20em
| colspan="2" style="background:#eee; text-align:center;"| Australian Idol finalists(with dates of elimination)
|-
| colspan="2" style="background:#ddd; text-align:center;"| Australian Idol season 1 finalists|-
|  Guy Sebastian || Winner
|-
|  Shannon Noll || 19 November
|-
|  Cosima De Vito || 3 November
|-
|  Paulini Curuenavuli || 27 October
|-
|  Rob Mills || 20 October
|-
|  Levi Kereama† || 13 October
|-
|  Rebekah LaVauney || 6 October
|-
|  Kelly Cavuoto || 6 October
|-
|  Lauren Buckley || 29 September
|-
|  Cle Wootton || 29 September
|-
|  Peter Ryan || 22 September
|-
|  Mathew Chadwick || 22 September
|-
| colspan="2" style="background:#ddd; text-align:center;"| Australian Idol season 2 (2004) finalists|-
|  Casey Donovan || Winner
|-
| Anthony Callea || 21 November
|-
|  Courtney Murphy || 8 November
|-
|  Hayley Jensen || 1 November
|-
|  Chanel Cole || 25 October
|-
|  Marty Worrall || 18 October
|-
| Ricki-Lee Coulter || 11 October
|-
|  Daniel Belle || 4 October
|-
|  Emelia Rusciano || 27 September
|-
|  Amali Ward || 20 September
|-
|  Dan O'Connor || 13 September
|-
|  Angeline Narayan || 6 September
|-
| colspan="2" style="background:#ddd; text-align:center;"| Australian Idol season 3 (2005) finalists|-
|  Kate DeAraugo || Winner
|-
|  Emily Williams || 21 November
|-
|  Lee Harding || 14 November
|-
|  Dan England || 7 November
|-
|  Daniel Spillane || 31 October
|-
|  Anne Robertson || 24 October
|-
| James Kannis || 17 October
|-
|  Milly Edwards || 10 October
|-
|  Roxane LeBrasse || 3 October
|-
|  Laura Gissara || 26 September
|-
|  Natalie Zahra || 19 September
|-
|  Chris Luder || 12 September
|-
|  Tarni Stephens || 12 September
|-
| colspan="2" style="background:#ddd; text-align:center;"| Australian Idol season 4 (2006) finalists|-
|  Damien Leith || Winner
|-
|  Jessica Mauboy || 26 November
|-
|  Dean Geyer || 13 November
|-
|  Chris Murphy || 6 November
|-
|  Ricky Muscat || 30 October
|-
|  Lisa Mitchell || 23 October
|-
|  Bobby Flynn || 16 October
|-
|  Lavina Williams || 9 October
|-
|  Guy "Mutto" Mutton || 2 October
|-
|  Klancie Keough || 25 September
|-
|  Reigan Derry || 18 September
|-
|  Joseph Gatehau || 11 September
|-
| colspan="2" style="background:#ddd; text-align:center;"| Australian Idol season 5 (2007) finalists|-
|  Natalie Gauci|| Winner
|-
|  Matt Corby|| 25 November
|-
|  Carl Riseley|| 12 November
|-
|  Marty Simpson|| 5 November
|-
|  Tarisai Vushe|| 29 October
|-
|  Daniel Mifsud|| 22 October
|-
|  Ben McKenzie|| 15 October
|-
|  Jacob Butler|| 8 October
|-
|  Mark Da Costa|| 1 October
|-
|  Lana Krost|| 24 September
|-
|  Brianna Carpenter|| 17 September
|-
|  Holly Weinert|| 10 September
|-
| colspan="2" style="background:#ddd; text-align:center;"| Australian Idol season 6 (2008) finalists|-
|  Wes Carr|| Winner
|-
|  Luke Dickens|| 23 November
|-
|  Mark Spano|| 17 November
|-
|  Teale Jakubenko|| 10 November
|-
|  Chrislyn Hamilton|| 3 November
|-
|  Roshani Priddis|| 27 October
|-
|  Sophie Paterson|| 20 October
|-
|  Thanh Bui|| 13 October
|-
|  Madam Parker|| 6 October
|-
|  Tom Williams|| 29 September
|-
|  Brooke Addamo|| 22 September
|-
|  Jonny Taylor|| 15 September
|-
| colspan="2" style="background:#ddd; text-align:center;"| Australian Idol season 7 (2009) finalists|-
|  Stan Walker|| Winner
|-
|  Hayley Warner|| 22 November
|-
|  James Johnston|| 15 November
|-
|  Nathan Brake|| 8 November
|-
|  Toby Moulton|| 1 November
|-
|  Kate Cook†|| 25 October
|-
|  Kim Cooper|| 18 October
|-
|  Scott Newnham|| 11 October
|-
|  Jared Gundy|| 4 October
|-
|  Sabrina Batshon|| 27 September
|-
|  Casey Barnes|| 20 September
|-
|  Ashleigh Toole|| 13 September
|-
| colspan="2" style="background:#ddd; text-align:center;"| Australian Idol season 8 (2023) finalists|-
| Anya Hynninen || TBD
|-
| Amali Dimond || TBD
|-
| Royston Sagigi-Baira || TBD
|-
| Ben Sheehy || TBD
|-
| Phoebe Stewart || TBD
|-
| Josh Hannam || TBD
|-
| Angelina Curtis || 13 March
|-
| Noora H || 13 March
|-
| Sash Seabourne || 6 March
|-
| Harry Hayden || 6 March
|-
| Maya Weiss || 27 February 
|-
| Jasey Fox || 27 February
|}

Series overview

 Judges and Hosts 

History
Australian Idol sought to discover the most commercial young singer in Australia through a series of nationwide auditions. The outcomes of the later stages of this competition were determined by public voting. It was the first show to use this system of voting in Australia. The original judging panel featured Mark Holden, Marcia Hines and Ian 'Dicko' Dickson. In 2005, this was changed as Dickson was replaced by Kyle Sandilands.

In 2007, Dickson again returned to the program, when Holden left at the end of the season. In 2009, Sandilands was replaced by Jay Dee Springbett.

Cancellation

Network Ten made the decision to "rest" the program for 2010 after poor ratings in 2009. No further comment was formally made regarding the future of Australian Idol on Network Ten until early 2013, following the network's acquisition of rights to the American series, when program chief Beverley McGarvey hinted it may return. However, later that same year, a Ten spokesperson confirmed that it would not be returning.

Revival
On 21 October 2020, Seven Network announced at their annual upfronts that they would be reviving the series, originally slated for 2022.

On 28 September 2022, Seven announced that Ricki-Lee Coulter and Scott Tweedie would be the new hosts, with the judging panel consisting of former American Idol judge Harry Connick Jr., former Australian Idol judge Kyle Sandilands, Amy Shark and Meghan Trainor. Original judge Marcia Hines appeared as a guest judge. The revival premiered on 30 January 2023.

Format

Auditions
Auditions were held in major cities around Australia to find each season's contestants. Any contestant who got a "yes" from a majority of judges was put through to the top 100 in Sydney. The TV episodes showed the most interesting auditions, which generally meant the worst and the best.

 In Seasons 1, 3, 4, 6 and 7, auditions were held in Sydney, Melbourne, Perth, Brisbane and Adelaide.
 In Season 5 auditions were also held in Darwin.
 In Season 2 in addition to the above cities, auditions were also held in Tamworth, Canberra and Hobart.

Top 100
Singers who progress from the auditions go to Sydney, in a stage which was sometimes called the Top 100 or Top 50 (season 8). Over a few days, these contestants are narrowed down to the semi-finalists.

Semi-finals
Over different seasons, the number of semi-finalists varied between 24 and 40, with between 8 and 10 contestants. For the first seven seasons, each semi-final was spread over two nights. On the first night, each semi-finalist sang a song, and was critiqued by each judge. Then over the next day, the public voted (by phone or SMS). The second night was results night, and the top 2 or 3 went through to the top 12. There was also included a "wild card" semi-final, to give some contestants a second chance to make the top 12.

For seasons 1 to 3, each semi-final took a week, with performances on Sunday night and results on Monday night. For seasons 4 onwards, the semi-finals were all in a single week, because there was greater viewer interest in the finals than the semi-finals.

The formats for the different seasons were:Season 1 had 5 semi-finalis of 8 contestants each. The top 2 in each semi-final made the top 12. A wild card round decided 2 more finalists (it turned out to be 3 after one contestant withdrew) - one judges' choice, two by public vote.Seasons 2 and 3 had 3 semi-finals of 10 contestants each, with the top 3 in each semi-final making the top 12. Then a further 3 were progressed from the wild card round (2 by judges' choice, 1 by public vote). (The wild card episode in the 3rd season had a little twist, when the judges announced a third person, namely, Roxanne Lebrasse, who also had the 2nd highest number of votes, would be included in the finals, making it a Top 13.)Seasons 4, 5, 6 and 7 had 4 semi-finals of 6 contestants each, with the top 2 in each semi-final making the top 12. Then a further 4 made the Top 12 from the wild card round. Seasons 4 and 5 had same gender semi-finals, while Season 6 had 3 males and 3 females in each semi-final. For the wild card show, Seasons 4 and 6 selected 3 by judges' choice and 1 by public vote; Season 5 selected 2 by judges' choice and 2 by public vote;.Season 8''' had 3 semi-finals of 8 contestants each, with the judges putting 4 from each through to the top 12, on the same night. There was no public voting and no wild card round.

For the first five seasons, contestants who made the semi-finals in previous seasons were not eligible to audition. From the 2008 season onwards, only Top 12 contestants from previous seasons were ineligible.

Finals (Top 12)
In the Season 1 to 7 finals, one contestant was eliminated per week. (With the exception of Season 1, which eliminated 2 in the first 3 weeks of the finals, and Season 3, which eliminated 2 in the first week of finals due to having a final 13). In the Season 8 finals, two contestants were eliminated per week.

Each week, contestants chose a song to a weekly theme on the Sunday night. (As the number of contestants got smaller, they sang two or three songs each). As in the semi-finals, each performance was critiqued by the judges, and then there was (approximately) 24 hours of voting by phone or SMS, before the results were announced on the Monday night. The eliminated competitor(s) then presented a final song – usually the number they sang the previous night. In Season 8, each of the bottom 4 performed on elimination night, after voting had closed but before the results were announced.

Grand Finale
The final results night, the Grand Finale, was held at the Sydney Opera House. It usually featured fireworks and an outdoor concert with many past Idol stars and other Australian musicians. It had been the highest rating episode of each season. The top 12 were celebrated and at the end of the night the winner was announced. Seasons 1–5 were held inside Sydney Opera House on the concert hall stage. For seasons 6 and 7, the finale was held on a stage erected on the Opera House forecourt.

After the first two seasons, the top 12 and top 10 went on a national tour. There were no tours for later seasons. However, there was a "Winner's Journey Tour" involving the winner with some guest performances from the Top 12 for seasons 4 and 5.

Touchdowns

A "touchdown" was awarded by judge Mark Holden when, in his own opinion, a contestant's performance was particularly good. Holden awarded his first ever "touchdown" to Cosima De Vito for her rendition of Cold Chisel's "When the War Is Over" in the Top 8 on Australian Made night in Season 1. De Vito also received a touchdown for her rendition of Respect, a classic hit by Aretha Franklin. Season 4 winner, Damien Leith and Season 2 winner, Casey Donovan have the record for the highest number of touchdowns at four apiece. Leith is the only contestant to receive two touchdowns in the same night. Emily Williams, and Matt Corby, runners-up of seasons 3 and 5 respectively both hold the record of receiving the most touchdowns without winning, at three apiece. In 2004, Top 8 contestants choice night, he awarded his only ever 'Grand Royal' Touchdown when Anthony Callea sang his stunning rendition of "The Prayer" which is still regarded as one of the most memorable performances of all seven series. Another two of Holden's most memorable "touchdowns" were awarded to Guy Sebastian for his rendition of "Climb Every Mountain" on the Top 3 show in Season 1 and to Jessica Mauboy for her rendition of Christina Aguilera's "Beautiful" on the Top 10 Number 1 Hits show in Season 4. Holden's final touchdown went to 2007 winner Natalie Gauci in the Top 4 on Big Band night during Season 5.

During Season 6, due to Holden's departure from the judging panel, the other judges awarded "touchdowns" themselves. The first "touchdown" was delivered by Kyle Sandilands to Chrislyn Hamilton on top 12 night. She later received another on Motown night by guest judge and first series winner, Guy Sebastian. Thanh Bui received one from Marcia Hines during ABBA night and Mark Spano was also delivered one by Ian "Dicko" Dickson during Top 6 Rolling Stones night. Eventual winner, Wes Carr was awarded two; one by Hines and guest judge Jermaine Jackson on Michael Jackson night and another on Top 3 night by Dickson.

An alternate version of a "touchdown" was done by Dickson if he believes the performance was extraordinary saying "big ticko from Dicko". This was used in one of Natalie Gauci's performances and a few other performances when Holden was around.

In the first seven seasons, a "touchdown" did not carry any official status. However in Season 8, during the Top 24 performances, each judge was allowed one "touchdown", which put a singer immediately through to the Top 12.

Season synopsis

Season 1

When Network Ten paid $15 million for the first season of Australian Idol they anticipated it to be a critical and financial success like it had been in other countries such as the UK and the USA. When the show aired for the first time in August 2003 it was a ratings bonanza attracting diverse ranges of viewers, from people wanting the crazy auditions to people who wanted to hear great voices. The audition process went through several major cities in Australia including Sydney, Melbourne, Perth, Adelaide and Darwin. Australian Idol became the most popular TV show in the country with more ratings than major events such as the AFL Grand Final. The Grand Final at the Sydney Opera House attracted more than 3 million viewers. It was listed as the ninth highest rating TV show in Australia in the past century in 2007. The eventual winner of the competition was Guy Sebastian with Shannon Noll finishing in 2nd place.

Guy Sebastian has released ten top 10 albums, with eight reaching the top 5, including three No. 1's. His debut album Just As I Am was certified 6× platinum and sold in excess of 480,000 units.  Beautiful Life, Closer to the Sun and Like It Like That were all platinum sellers, with The Memphis Album, Twenty Ten and Armageddon reaching double platinum.ARIA Charts – Accreditations – 2008 Albums. Australian Recording Industry Association (ARIA). Archived from the original on 25 January 2012.ARIA Album Certifications 2014 . Australian Recording Industry Association. Retrieved 31 October 2014 Madness has been certified gold. His most recent album, T.R.U.T.H. became his third number one album and has been certified gold. He has also released 23 top 20 singles, with 14 reaching the top ten, including six No. 1's. Sebastian is the only Australian male artist in Australian music history to achieve six No. 1 singles, and is third overall for all Australian acts. His debut single Angels Brought Me Here was the highest selling single in Australia in 2003, reaching 5× platinum certification. It won the 2004 ARIA for Highest Selling Single, and in 2010 ARIA announced it was the highest selling song of the previous decade.Winners by year – 2004. ARIA Awards. Archived from the original  on 23 January 2012. "Like It Like That" the title track from his fifth album reached 4× platinum and was the highest selling Australian artist single of 2009.ARIA Charts Top 50 Australian Artist Singles 2009 . Australian Recording Industry Association. Retrieved 26 December 2010. "Who's That Girl", Twenty Tens only single, reached 5× platinum certification and won the 2011 ARIA Award for Highest Selling Single.ARIA Charts Top 50 Australian Artist Singles 2010. Australian Recording Industry Association. Retrieved 5 February 2011 "Don't Worry Be Happy, the lead single of Sebastian's seventh album Armageddon also reached 5× platinum. The third single "Battle Scars" featuring Lupe Fiasco debuted at No. 1, becoming his sixth No. 1 single in Australia, and achieved 12× platinum certification.ARIA Accreditations – 2019 Singles. Australian Recording Industry Association (ARIA). Retrieved 30 March 2019. Sebastian has been awarded 69 platinum and seven gold certifications for albums and singles in Australia, the highest for any Australian Idol contestant.

"Angels Brought Me Here" reached No. 1 in Malaysia, Singapore, The Philippines, Indonesia and New Zealand.Beautiful Life & Guy Facts. opensubscriber.com. Archived from the original on 19 January 2012. Sebastian achieved a second No. 1 on the New Zealand Charts with "Who's That Girl", and reached the Top 10 with his debut album and four other singles, and has six platinum and three gold certifications there.RIANZ Archived Charts 1999–2011 .Recording Industry Association of New Zealand (RIANZ). Retrieved 17 September 2012.Official New Zealand Music Charts – 26 November 2012.Recording Industry Association New Zealand (RIANZ). Archived from the original on 25 November 2012. Sebastian is currently the Australian Idol contestant to chart in the US. "Battle Scars" reached No. 71 on the Billboard Hot 100, No. 23 on the Billboard Digital Songs Chart and No. 1 on the Billboard R&B/Hip-hop Digital Song Chart.R&B/Hip-hop Digital Song Chart 15 September 2012 Billboard.biz. Archived from the original on 13 September 2012. It has spent 20 weeks in the Hot 100 and has been certified platinum in the US for sales of one million.Adams, Cameron (6 August 2013).Guy Sebastian's Battle Scars tops one million US sales news.com.au. Retrieved 7 August 2013  "Battle Scars" also reached No. 2 in Norway. In 2015 Sebastian was selected to represent Australia in the Eurovision Song Contest. He finished 5th, and his song "Tonight Again" charted in the top 50 in a number of European countries, including No.6 in Iceland and 16 in Austria.Guy Sebastian – Tonight Again, Chartlist week 21, 2015. Tonlist. Archived from the original on 1 June 2015. During his career Sebastian has received 32 ARIA Award nominations, winning six of them, including Best Pop Release and Best Live Act.ARIA Nominations. Australian Recording Industry Association. 28 September 2010. Archived from the original on 21 January 2012.Winners of the 2011 ARIA Awards. Sydney Morning Herald. 27 November 2011. Archived from the original on 30 November 2012.Smith, Sarah (6 October 2014). Chet Faker and Violent Soho lead 2014 ARIA nominations. Faster Louder. Archived from the original on 7 October 2014.Here are all the winners from the 2019 ARIA Awards.The Music Network. 27 November 2019. Retrieved 28 November 2019.

Shannon Noll has released five top 10 albums. His debut album That's What I'm Talking About gained 5× platinum certification and his second album Lift reached 3× platinum, both debuting at No. 1 on the ARIA charts.Australian Recording Industry Association Accreditations – 2006 Albums Retrieved 13 October 2009 His third album, Turn It Up, peaked at No. 3 and achieved platinum certification, His fourth album No Turning Back: The Story So Far reached No. 7, with his fifth album A Million Suns peaking at #8. Neither of these albums have gained certification. Between 2004 and 2007 Noll released ten top 10 singles including three #1's, and he is the only Australian male artist to have achieved 10 consecutive top 10 singles.Shannon Noll Biography. Musical Theatre Australia. Archived from the original on 25 January 2012. Since then he has released seven more singles, with two reaching the top 50, the highest one peaking at #26. "What About Me" was the highest selling single in Australia in 2004 and he received ARIA nominations for highest seller for it and his debut album at the 2004 Aria Awards.ARIA Charts Top 100 Singles 2004 Retrieved 13 October 2009 He also received nominations for best pop release for his second album Lift and a highest selling single nomination for its lead single "Shine" in 2006. "Don't Give Up" a duet with Natalie Bassingthwaighte was nominated for highest selling single at the 2007 ARIA Awards. He has a total of 17 platinum and three gold certifications for albums and singles in Australia. Noll's first single "What About Me" also reached No. 2 in Ireland and No. 10 in New Zealand, with his debut album peaking at No. 31 in NZ.newzealandcharts.com Shannon Noll in the New Zealand Charts Retrieved 13 October 2009

Paulini who came fourth has released two albums as a solo artist, One Determined Heart which reached No. 1 and gained platinum certification, and Superwoman which peaked at #77. She has also released four top 50 singles including the No. 1 "Angel Eyes", a platinum seller which was nominated for highest selling single at the 2004 ARIA Awards. In 2007, Paulini was nominated for "Urban Music Awards" for "Best R&B Album" & "Best Female Artist" for Superwoman. Paulini was also a member of The Young Divas, who released two Top 10 albums and four Top 50 singles.

The other top 5 contestants in season one were Cosima De Vito who came 3rd, & Rob Mills who finished in 5th place. After Idol it was these five, the Final 5, who were the most successful out of the Top 12. Other Idol contestants from Season 1 to release music were Levi Kereama, Rebekah LaVauney, Peter Ryan and Courtney Act. All of these independent acts achieved limited success.

Season 2

As well as the five larger cities, the judges also visited Canberra, Hobart, Darwin and Tamworth this year. Of the twelve finalists, three were from Sydney, two were from Melbourne, and one each from Brisbane, the Gold Coast, Hobart, Perth, Canberra, Adelaide and Bega.

The winner was Casey Donovan. The runners up (in descending order) were Anthony Callea, Courtney Murphy, Hayley Jensen & Chanel Cole. The final two, as well as Ricki-Lee Coulter (7th), were the only contestants from the Top 12 to be signed to a record company.  Callea was the highest seller of the three, with his first release "The Prayer" spending five consecutive weeks at No 1, and becoming the second highest selling song in Australia last decade overall and for an Australian artist. Chanel Cole and Daniel Belle teamed up under the name Spook to release an album in October 2005; a bootleg album for Chanel was also released in November 2005. Top 30 contestants Ngaiire Joseph and Marty Worrall each released a single in late 2005, and Hayley Jensen an album in September 2007. Daniel O'Connor, another of the Top 12, gained a role on Neighbours.

The Grand finale of this series remains the highest rated show out of all broadcast over the five seasons.

On a darker note, Telstra, a major sponsor of the series, made an embarrassing error when they issued a series of half-page advertisements in major newspapers congratulating Donovan on her victory, with a reference to her website. However, the address was incorrect, leading to a website about gay porn star Casey Donovan, rather than the singer's. The company issued a prompt apology upon realising their mistake.

After this season, judge Ian Dickson left the series, later to appear in the Seven Network reality TV shows My Restaurant Rules, Dancing with the Stars and most recently, Australian Celebrity Survivor. The 2004 season was also notable for an Asian contestant named "Flynn", who sang the Freestylers song "Push Up" after being found from a terrible audition, in the same vein as William Hung.

Season 3

For the first time in 'Australian Idol' history there were 13 finalists. This came about during the Wildcard Verdict show on 5 September 2005. The judges initially chose James Kannis and Emily Williams to go through to the final. This left one spot which was chosen by the Australian public. Out of the remaining contestants the two that received the highest votes were Daniel Spillane and Roxane Lebrasse. With only 1% between them, Dan was announced as the final member of the Top 12. This meant Roxane had missed out yet again. The judges decided however that Roxane was too good to be left out of the Top 12 so they made it a Top 13. The catch was that two contestants were eliminated in the first round of the finals.

On 21 November 2005, the winner was announced and it was Kate DeAraugo. Kate was an outside chance to win throughout the whole season and after the show had ended Kate released a No. 1 single, a platinum selling album and a further Top 10 hit single through Sony BMG. Kate is currently working with all-girl group Young Divas, which is made up of past Idol contestants which include Paulini Curuenavuli, Jessica Mauboy and Emily Williams.
Runner up Emily Williams lost by 1% in the closest percentage ever in an Idol finale. She was originally signed to Sony BMG as a solo artist, but the agreement fell through. She is also a member of Young Divas and has had much success with them.

Lee Harding finished in third position and was signed to Sony BMG and released a # 1 single and a platinum selling album. His second single from his debut album proved to be less successful and in mid-2006 Harding was released from his contract with the label. He is currently touring and performing with Bedrock.

Dan England came 4th and didn't score a recording contract with a major label but recorded several independent releases and has toured with Season 2 winner Casey Donovan and Season 1 runner-up Shannon Noll.

Anne Robertson who finished in sixth position was negotiating a deal with Sony BMG, but it was rumoured that Sony BMG was reluctant in signing her as they believed she was too similar to Season 1 contestant Paulini Curuenavuli who had been signed to the label for several years.
Other Idol contestants from Season 3 have released numerous independent material and have toured and performed with several bands and music groups.

Although averaging around the 1.5 million viewer mark, ratings were down by up to 40% on average during the third season compared to the first two seasons, which regularly drew more than 2.5 million viewers during the latter half of the competition. This created a serious situation for Ten, which was airing three Australian Idol shows every week at the time, and forced them to give away free commercial airtime to program sponsors expecting higher ratings. Commentators has theorised over the reasons why this has occurred, ranging from the viewing public being tired of the format due to Sandilands replacing the popular Dickson. This caused a major Idol revamp for Season 4 which meant Season 4 being one of the highest rating seasons yet.

Season 4

Changes for the fourth season of Australian Idol included the cancellation of "Inside Idol"; a "streamlined" semi-finals (replaced with a variant of the 12 females, 12 males format popularised by American Idol); and the contestants will be able to bring instruments with them on stage for at least one of the final shows. Also, the fourth season's television promos promised a change in the viewer's role in the show, revealed to be an SMS service called 199-JUDGE which allows viewers to SMS their opinions on the judges' reactions.

Damien Leith was named the winner of Australian Idol 2006 on 26 November, beating Jessica Mauboy for the title. Leith is the fifth most successful Australian Idol contestant behind Guy Sebastian, Shannon Noll, Mauboy and Anthony Callea. He has been awarded 7 platinum and one gold certification and achieved sales of 525,000+. He has the third highest album sales for a contestant. He achieved two No. 1 albums, The Winner's Journey which sold 4× platinum and Where We Land which gained platinum certification. His first single, Night of My Life stayed at No. 1 for four consecutive weeks and was certified platinum after one week of sales. It was the fastest selling debut single for 2006. Leith won 4 ARIA No. 1 Chart Awards, and the 2007 ARIA Award for Highest Selling Album for The Winner's Journey. His third studio album Catch the Wind: Songs of a Generation peaked at No. 2, reaching gold status.  His fourth album Remember June released in 2009 peaked at No. 25. In 2010 Leith released a covers album of Roy Orbison songs titled Roy which reached No. 2 and platinum certification. His sixth album Now and Then released in 2012 peaked at #12. He has also released two novels and hosted Network Ten's television series "Saving Kids".

Jessica Mauboy went on to join ex-Idol girl group Young Divas, after member from season 2, Ricki-Lee Coulter, left the group. Mauboy has since gained much success as a solo artist. Her first studio album Been Waiting peaked at No. 11, spent 59 weeks on the charts and achieved 2× platinum status. Mauboy has also enjoyed success with her singles "Running Back" which was certified 2× platinum and second single "Burn" which reached No. 1 and achieved platinum status. Her third single "Been Waiting" peaked at No. 12, fourth single "Because" peaked at No. 9 and her 5th single "Up/Down" peaked at #11. These three singles all reached gold certification. Her second studio album Get 'Em Girls peaked at No. 6 and achieved gold certification. Five top 20 singles were released from the album, including 2 which achieved platinum and 2 double platinum certification. Mauboy has achieved 11 platinum and 5 gold certifications and received 12 ARIA Award nominations, including one win during her career as a recording artist. Third place getter Dean Geyer later released his debut album Rush and top ten single "If You Don't Mean It" and starred on the Australian long-time running soap Neighbours from 2008 to 2009.

Season 5

Ian "Dicko" Dickson rejoined the show as one of the judges, along with Mark Holden, Marcia Hines and Kyle Sandilands from 2006. The series was again hosted by Andrew G and James Mathison. The show continued with the format from Season 4 where contestants could use instruments throughout the show and for their audition they could perform original material rather than covering other artist's work.

Natalie Gauci went on to win the series, beating Matt Corby for the title. Natalie released her debut platinum selling album "The Winner's Journey". After the winner's single "Here I Am" debuted at No. 2 on the ARIA Charts, and the album debuted at No. 11. Natalie released her second album in 2012.

Carl Riseley, who finished third in the contest went on to release a swing-style album titled "The Rise", debuting at No. 5 on the ARIA Charts. Carl Riseley's 2nd cd "the stillest hour" was released 24 April 2009 and peaked at NO#1 on the ARIA jazz chart.

Season 6

Changes to the Australian Idol format for season 6 include judge Mark Holden leaving the show and temporary absence of host Andrew Günsberg, and auditions held for the first time in the United Kingdom. This was also the first season where the Top 4 contestants were all male, and the second time with two male grand finalists, after Season 1 Finale with Guy Sebastian and Shannon Noll. On 23 November, Wes Carr was announced as Australian Idol for 2008, beating Luke Dickens.

Season 7

On 10 November 2008, it was announced that a seventh season of Australian Idol would be produced and aired in late 2009.

James Mathison announced on 31 March 2009 that he was leaving the show after six seasons. Andrew G continued hosting along with Ricki-Lee Coulter who was once again co-host.

On 1 June 2009, musical director John Foreman announced that he was also leaving the show after six seasons. Foreman's right-hand man, David Pritchard-Blunt, was announced as his replacement.

On 3 August, Kyle Sandilands was let go as a judge on Australian Idol, after an on-air radio stunt went wrong. "Australian Idol is very much a family program and its appeal is very much right across the board, and we'd like to think that all families can enjoy the program in front of the TV," Idol Executive David Mott stated on the daily news.

It was announced on 3 August 2009, via a press statement from Network Ten, that Sandilands had been sacked from Australian Idol due to this incident. He was replaced by Jay Dee Springbett, a Sony music executive.

A Network Ten spokesman said of Sandilands' firing:
"Idol has remained a family-focused show, even more so this year with the 6.30 pm Sunday timeslot. His radio persona has taken on a more controversial position ... which is not in the interest of the show."
Of being fired from Australia Idol, Sandilands said in a statement that "I'm disappointed at Channel Ten's decision to remove me from Australian Idol. I have truly loved being a part of the show." Network Ten had held crisis talks with advertisers in the days prior to his firing amid concerns Sandilands would damage their brands. Idol creator Simon Fuller reportedly gave Ten his blessing to fire Sandilands. It was believed Sandilands earned $1 million of his estimated annual $2.8 million income from Idol.

The promotional commercial for the season featured various "Legends". It featured impersonations of Elvis, Madonna, Michael Jackson, the Supremes, Christina Aguilera, and Mariah Carey among others. The Australian Idol hopefuls were featured covering Mariah Carey's "Emotions" as the soundtrack to this commercial.

The 7th season began on 9 August at 6.30 pm. This was the first year that previously rejected contestants could return to audition again. The only ineligible contestants were those who previously made the Top 12/13. Semi-finalists (Top 24/30) had the opportunity to re-audition for the show.

Season 7 was also broadcast in New Zealand, five days after the initial airing in Australia. This marked the return of the show to New Zealand screens after a 4-year absence.

* Toby Moulton withdrew hence keeping original eliminee in the competition.

Season 8

In November 2020, the Seven Network announced that the show would be revived in early 2022, 13 years since it last aired. However, the revival was delayed to 2023.

On 28 September 2022, Ricki-Lee Coulter and Scott Tweedie were announced as the new hosts. Harry Connick Jr. alongside Amy Shark, Meghan Trainor and Kyle Sandilands were announced as the judging panel for the revived series. On 24 October 2022, Marcia Hines was announced as a guest judge for the season.

Filming for the auditions took place in October 2022 in Sydney, Melbourne, Adelaide, Perth, and the Gold Coast. Filming for the top 50 took place at the Sydney Coliseum Theatre.

19 March - all singers were up for elimination that week.

Controversies
Weight comments

After a performance, judge Ian "Dicko" Dickson told Paulini Curuenavuli that to wear the dress she had chosen she would need to "shed some pounds". This caused outrage and heated debate. The TV show 20 to 1 named the controversy in an episode of its show titled "Aussie Scandals". Kyle Sandilands claimed that 2005 winner, Kate DeAraugo, had “tuck-shop arms”.

Hillsong voting claims
In October 2007, criticism was levelled at the fairness of the program's telephone voting system, where 50% of the remaining contestants were stated by the media to be members of the Hillsong Church. The 50% of remaining contestants dispute was put to rest- when Daniel and Ben both said they did not have any affiliations with the Assemblies of God, and raising concerns of vote-stacking by the church congregation.

 Revenue generation 
In November, reporter Neil Wooldridge stated that although the producers are coy about how much was being made from SMS promotions that "some commentators estimate Telstra and Network Ten, partners in the 'Australian Idol' program, made up to $900,000 profit each episode."

In 2003, it was estimated that viewers cast 20 million votes. At 55 cents for each telephone call or text message, that equated to $11 million.  Network Ten paid around $13 million for each season.

See also

 List of Australian music television shows
 Idol series''
 List of Australian television series
 Australian Idol discography
 List of Australian Idol semi finalists
 Music of Australia
 Pop Idol

References

External links
 
Australian Idol at the National Film and Sound Archive
 Australian Idol 2008 Blog

2000s Australian reality television series
2003 Australian television series debuts
2009 Australian television series endings
2020s Australian reality television series
2023 Australian television series debuts
Australian Idol
Australian music television series
Australian television series based on British television series
Australian television series revived after cancellation
English-language television shows
Music competitions in Australia
Network 10 original programming
Seven Network original programming
Television series by Fremantle (company)
Television shows set in Sydney